The MEKO 200 is a frigate design by the Blohm + Voss shipyard of Germany, as part of the MEKO family of warships.

Variants

Anzac class (MEKO 200ANZ)

Ten MEKO 200 frigates were built to the Anzac-class design: eight for the Royal Australian Navy, and two for the Royal New Zealand Navy.

The Australian Department of Defence decided to upgrade their Anzacs even before all ships were completed. The upgraded configuration includes RGM-84 Harpoon anti-ship missiles fitted in two quad launchers, Evolved Sea Sparrow missiles quad-packed in VLS enabling 32 missiles to be carried, four Nulka active missile decoy bays, and the TSM 5424 Petrel mine and obstacle avoidance sonar system. All upgrades and new builds are scheduled for completion by 2006.

In 2004 Tenix, Saab, and the Australian Department of Defence formed a Private Public Partnership to upgrade the anti-ship missile defence capability of the Anzac class. This upgrade will include Sagem Vampir NG IRST (infra-red search and track) capability, Saab 9LV Combat Management System upgrade and CEA Technologies PAR 3D E/F band fixed active phased array radar and illuminator. A new main mast will be constructed to incorporate the CEAFAR and CEAMOUNT systems and maintain the existing 2D radar and electronic surveillance capabilities.

The two RNZN frigates have been upgraded under the Future Systems Upgrade Program at Seaspan Shipyard in Victoria, British Columbia, Canada. The upgrades included the MBDA Sea Ceptor SAM (20 missiles), new soft kill self defence systems, Lockheed Martin Canada's CMS 330 Combat Management System, new sonar processing systems and an underwater communications system.

Yavuz/Barbaros class (MEKO 200TN)

The Turkish variant, MEKO 200TN, is a modified MEKO 200 type multirole frigate. The first order for the Turkish Navy was signed during April 1983 with two MEKO 200TN built in Germany and two built in the Gölcük shipyards in Turkey. Two more orders followed, each known as Track IIA  and Track IIB. The Yavuz-class frigates have adopted the CODAD propulsion method with 4 MTU 20V Diesel engines, which require a substantial amount of maintenance. There were also questions over the selection of the Swiss manufactured Sea Zenith, an advanced CIWS system that was never previously used on any naval platform, but there have been no negative reports regarding the system's performance from the Turkish Navy. The later Track IIA frigates have incorporated major improvements including the CODOG propulsion method with two MTU 16V diesel engines and two LM2500-30 gas turbines, a greater displacement of 3,350 tons (full load) and the replacement of the older Mk-29 Sea Sparrow launcher with the Mk-41 Mod 8 VLS.

These frigates are considered to be used not for naval superiority but rather as sea-denying assets that will try to inflict maximum damage to the enemy, while trying to keep friendly casualties low. Their armament includes the FMC Mk 45 127 mm/54 caliber gun, eight RGM-84 Harpoons, two triple-mounted Mk 32 324 mm torpedo tubes, and 8/16 RIM-7 Sea Sparrow missiles. Electronic equipment includes the DA 08/ AWS-9 surface/air surveillance radar, the WM 25/ AWS 6 tracking radar, the TM 1226/ 2690BT ARPA navigation radar, and STACOS TU/FD Tactical Command and Control System. The Turkish frigates are also equipped with WM25/ COSYS DDWCS Fire Control System, a DE1160 sonar, and Link 11/14 VESTA CDL2, MCS2002 communication systems.

Vasco da Gama class (MEKO 200PN)

The , a development of the MEKO 200 PN German concept, are major surface ships of the Portuguese Navy. Portugal operates three ships of this class, which were built in Kiel by Blohm + Voss and later by HDW, using modular construction techniques. These vessels are unique in the MEKO 200 family as they are the only ones equipped with the French 100mm naval gun as their main gun.

The project for the construction of three frigates of this class was authorized by the Portuguese Government in 1985, five years after the request of the Portuguese Navy for the acquisition of new surface ships.

Hydra class (MEKO 200HN)

The MEKO frigates have high-level specifications for shock resistance, stiffness requirements for the fire control and radar systems, and blast and gas pressure resistance to retain the integrity of the on-board weapon systems. The hull is constructed of high tensile steel with a yield strength of S355 N/mm² 'structural steel grades'.

The ship is divided into twelve self-sufficient watertight sections, which function almost independently of each other. Each compartment also has independent data transfer to the ship’s Naval Automation System, Nautos.

The four s of the Hellenic Navy of Greece are 3200-ton frigates of the MEKO 200HN design. The first of the four, Hydra was built by Blohm + Voss in Hamburg and commissioned in 1992. The other three were constructed at the Hellenic Shipyards Co. at Skaramagas. Spetsai was commissioned in 1996, Psara in 1998 and Salamis in 1999. Three Hydra-class frigates were deployed in support of Operation Enduring Freedom 2002–2003.

Valour class (MEKO A-200SAN)

The improved A-200SAN design incorporates new signature reduction measures. The combat management system is sourced from Thales. Two SuperLynx 300, one Atlas Oryx, two AgustaWestland AW109, one Rooivalk or various UAVs can be accommodated.

Erradii class (MEKO A-200AN) 

The MEKO A-200AN is based on the MEKO A-200SAN. The ships were ordered from ThyssenKrupp Marine Systems; construction was subcontracted to the ADM Kiel shipyard. There was an option for two more in 2014 but as of 2021 the number of ships in service was two.

The MEKO A-200AN include the following equipment:
 Oto Melara 127/64 LW 127 mm main gun
 MSI-Defence 30 mm cannons
 Denel Dynamics Umkhonto-IR surface-to-air missiles
 Saab/Diehl Defence RBS-15 Mk3 anti-ship missiles
 Rheinmetall Defence MASS softkill decoy launchers
 Saab Sea Giraffe AMB 3-D surveillance radar
 Saab CEROS 200 radar/electro-optical fire control directors
 Thales UMS4132 Kingklip sonar

In 2016, Navy Recognition reported that the MEKO A-200AN was expected to use the CODAG-WARP (WAter jet and Refined Propellers) propulsion like the MEKO A-200SAN, with the MEKO A-200AN having a water-jet drive and two propellers.

Al-Aziz class (MEKO A-200EN) 

In December 2021, the German government approved the sale of 3 frigates to Egypt. This order was increased to 4 then to the current 6 frigates with some to be built in Egypt. The first vessel was handed over on 14 October 2022.

The MEKO A-200EN included the following equipment:
 Oto Melara 127/64 LW 127 mm main gun
 MSI-Defence 30 mm cannons
 32 VLS cells for VL MICA NG surface to air missiles
 8 Exocet anti-ship missiles
 Rheinmetall Defence MASS softkill decoy launchers
 NS-110 4D AESA radar

Operators
 : 2 MEKO A-200AN (Erradii class)
 : 8 MEKO 200ANZ (Anzac class)
 : 4 MEKO 200HN (Hydra class)
 : 3 MEKO 200PN (Vasco da Gama class)
 : 4 MEKO A-200SAN (Valour class)
 : 8 MEKO 200TN (4 x Yavuz class, 4 x Barbaros class)
 : 2 MEKO 200ANZ (Anzac class)
 : 1+(5) MEKO A-200EN (Al-Aziz class) MEKO A-200EN frigates ordered. Germany approved the export of three German-built ships in December 2021. The last ship is to be built in Egypt.

See also
 
 
 
 
 MEKO 140
 Meko 360

References

Citations

Bibliography

External links

Thyssenkrupp-marinesystems.com
Turkishnavy.net
Naval-technology.com
MEKO A Class Combat Ship Family, Germany(Naval Technology)

Frigate classes
Frigates of Germany